L'Érable (Maple) is a regional county municipality in the Centre-du-Québec region of Quebec, Canada. Named for its maple trees, the area is rural in nature and is located 50 km southwest of Quebec City. Its seat is Plessisville.

Subdivisions
There are 11 subdivisions within the RCM:

Cities & Towns (2)
 Plessisville
 Princeville

Municipalities (6)
 Inverness
 Laurierville
 Lyster
 Sainte-Sophie-d'Halifax
 Saint-Ferdinand
 Villeroy

Parishes (3)
 Notre-Dame-de-Lourdes
 Plessisville
 Saint-Pierre-Baptiste

Demographics
Mother tongue from 2016 Canadian Census

Transportation

Access Routes
Highways and numbered routes that run through the municipality, including external routes that start or finish at the county border:

 Autoroutes
 None

 Principal Highways
 
 

 Secondary Highways
 
 
 
 

 External Routes
 None

See also
 List of regional county municipalities and equivalent territories in Quebec

References

 
Census divisions of Quebec